"This Little Piggy" or "This Little Pig Went to Market" is an English-language nursery rhyme and fingerplay. It has a Roud Folk Song Index number of 19297.

Lyrics

One popular version is:

Fingerplay

The rhyme is usually counted out on an infant or toddler's toes, each line corresponding to a different toe, usually starting with the big toe and ending with the little toe. A foot tickle is added during the "Wee...all the way home" section of the last line. The rhyme can also be seen as a counting rhyme, although the number of each toe (from one for the big toe to five for the little toe) is never stated.

Origins
In 1728, the first line of the rhyme appeared in a medley called "The Nurses Song". The first known full version was recorded in The Famous Tommy Thumb's Little Story-Book, published in London about 1760. In this book, the rhyme goes:
This pig went to market,
That pig stayed home;
This pig had roast meat,
That pig had none;
This pig went to the barn's door,
And cried week, week for more.

The full rhyme continued to appear, with slight variations, in many late 18th- and early 19th-century collections. Until the mid-20th century, the lines referred to "little pigs".

Reception
It was the eighth most popular nursery rhyme in a 2009 survey in the United Kingdom.
 
The rhyme was included in Beatrix Potter's illustrated book Cecily Parsley's Nursery Rhymes in 1922. The only known full set of her four original watercolour illustrations of the rhyme sold for £60,000 in 2012.

See also
 Five Little Pigs, a novel by Agatha Christie that takes inspiration from the nursery rhyme

References

Fictional pigs
Songs about pigs
English folk songs
English children's songs
Traditional children's songs
Finger plays
English nursery rhymes
Year of song unknown
Songwriter unknown
Pigs in literature